D24 may refer to:

Vehicles 
Aircraft
 Albaviation D24 MagicOne, an Italian ultralight

Ships
 , a Battle-class destroyer of the Royal Nav
 , an Attacker-class escort carrier of the Royal Navy
 , a W-class destroyer of the Royal Nav
 , a Fletcher-class destroyer of the Spanish Navy

Surface vehicles
 Dodge Custom, an American full-size car
 Lancia D24, a British racing car
 Pennsylvania Railroad class D24, a locomotive classification of the Pennsylvania Railroad

Other uses 
 D24 road (Croatia)
 Dublin 24, a postal district in Ireland
 Elbe Marshes, a natural region in Germany
 Iyaguchi Station in Miyoshi, Tokushima Prefecture, Japan
 Kelantan State Route D24, now Malaysia Federal Route 260
 Volkswagen D24 engine, a diesel engine made by Volvo
 D24, or Sultan, a durian cultivar
 d24, a die with 24 sides